Osuchów-Kolonia  is a village in the administrative district of Gmina Mszczonów, within Żyrardów County, Masovian Voivodeship, in east central Poland.

The village has a population of 20.

References

Villages in Żyrardów County